Machnówek  is a village in the administrative district of Gmina Ulhówek, within Tomaszów Lubelski County, Lublin Voivodeship, in eastern Poland, close to the border with Ukraine.

The village has a population of 170.

References

Villages in Tomaszów Lubelski County